Vaudricourt may refer to two communes in France:
 Vaudricourt, Pas-de-Calais
 Vaudricourt, Somme